The England women's cricket team played the New Zealand women's cricket team in February–March 2012. The tour consisted of five Women's Twenty20 Internationals (WT20I) followed by three Women's One Day Internationals (WODIs). Ahead of the WT20I fixtures, England Women played 3 warm-up matches (one 50-overs match and two 20-overs match) against New Zealand Emerging Players Women team, with all three matches taking place in Lincoln.

Squads

Tour matches

50-over match: New Zealand Emerging Players Women v England Women

1st 20-over match: New Zealand Emerging Players Women v England Women

2nd 20-over match: New Zealand Emerging Players Women v England Women

WT20I series

1st WT20I

2nd WT20I

3rd WT20I

4th WT20I

5th WT20I

WODI series

1st WODI

2nd WODI

3rd WODI

References

External links
England Women tour of New Zealand 2011/12 from Cricinfo

International cricket competitions in 2012
New Zealand 2011/12 
Women's international cricket tours of New Zealand 
2012 in women's cricket